Trimethylamine N-oxide (TMAO) is an organic compound with the formula (CH3)3NO. It is in the class of amine oxides. Although the anhydrous compound is known, trimethylamine N-oxide is usually encountered as the dihydrate. Both the anhydrous and hydrated materials are white, water-soluble solids.

TMAO is found in the tissues of marine crustaceans and marine fish, where it prevents water pressure from distorting proteins and thus killing the animal.

TMAO is a product of the oxidation of trimethylamine, a common metabolite of choline in animals.

Marine animals
Trimethylamine N-oxide is an osmolyte found in molluscs, crustaceans, and all marine fishes and bony fishes. It is a protein stabilizer that serves to counteract the protein-destabilizing effects of pressure. In general, the bodies of animals living at great depths are adapted to high pressure environments by having pressure-resistant biomolecules and small organic molecules present in their cells, known as piezolytes, of which TMAO is the most abundant. These piezolytes give the proteins the flexibility they need to function properly under great pressure.

TMAO decomposes to trimethylamine (TMA), which is the main odorant that is characteristic of degrading seafood.

Chemistry
TMAO can be synthesized from trimethylamine by treatment with hydrogen peroxide:
H2O2 + (CH3)3N  →  H2O + (CH3)3NO

The dihydrate is dehydrated by azeotropic distillation from dimethylformamide.

Laboratory applications
Trimethylamine oxide is used in protein folding experiments to counteract the unfolding effects of urea.

In the organometallic chemistry reaction of nucleophilic abstraction, Me3NO is employed as a decarbonylation agent according to the following stoichiometry:
M(CO)n + Me3NO + L  →  M(CO)n−1L + Me3N + CO2

This reaction is used to decomplex organic ligands from metals, e.g. from (diene)Fe(CO)3.

It is used in certain oxidation reactions, e.g. the conversion of alkyl iodides to the corresponding aldehyde.

Effects on protein stability
The effects of TMAO on the backbone and charged residues of peptides are found to stabilize compact conformations, whereas effects of TMAO on nonpolar residues lead to peptide swelling. This suggests competing mechanisms of TMAO on proteins, which accounts for hydrophobic swelling, backbone collapse, and stabilization of charge-charge interactions. These mechanisms are observed in Trp cage.

Disorders

Trimethylaminuria

Trimethylaminuria is a rare defect in the production of the enzyme flavin-containing monooxygenase 3 (FMO3). Those suffering from trimethylaminuria are unable to convert choline-derived trimethylamine into trimethylamine oxide. Trimethylamine then accumulates and is released in the person's sweat, urine, and breath, giving off a strong fishy odor.

Cardiovascular disease

High TMAO concentrations are associated with an increased risk of cardiovascular disease and all-cause mortality.

Potential toxicity
Due to its widespread use in industry, various exposure limit guidelines with a detailed description of toxicity are available such as "Recommendation from the Scientific Committee on Occupational Exposure Limits" by the European Union Commission.

References

See also
Greenland shark

Amine oxides
Lipid disorders
Nutrition
Oxidizing agents
Quaternary ammonium compounds
Microbiomes